Bzyb, Bzyp, Bzyph or Bziphi may refer to the following entities in Abkhazia, Georgia:

 Bzyb (region), a historical region of Abkhazia
 Bzyb (village)
 Bzyb Abkhaz, a sub-group of the Abkhaz people
 Bzyb dialect, a dialect of the Abkhaz language
 Bzyb Range, a mountain range bounded by the Bzyb river
 Bzyb River, a river in the region